Johannes Leonardus "Hans" Spekman (born 6 April 1966) is a Dutch politician of the Labour Party. He was a local politician in Utrecht from 1994 to 2006 and a member of the House of Representatives from 2006 to 2012. He was the party chair of the Labour Party between 2012 and 2017.

Early life and career 
Johannes Leonardus Spekman was born on 6 April 1966 in Zevenhuizen in South Holland in the Netherlands.

He worked as a welder, mover, and environmental bookseller.

Politics 
Spekman has been a member of the Labour Party since 1986.

He was a member of the municipal council of Utrecht from 1 April 1994 to 1 January 2001 and an alderman of Utrecht from 1 January 2001 to 1 May 2006.

Spekman was a member of the House of Representatives from 30 November 2006 to 24 January 2012. He focused on matters of alien and asylum policy, employment and social assistance policy, as well as poverty and benefit fraud control.

Spekman has been chairman of the Labour Party since 2 January 2012, when he succeeded Lilianne Ploumen.

In 2016 he organized a battle for the leadership of the Labour Party between the then–party leader Diederik Samsom and deputy prime minister Lodewijk Asscher. The battle had a disastrous effect on the unity within the party and led to the end of the political career of Samsom. In 2017 Spekman led the campaign of his party in the parliamentary elections for the House of Representatives. On March 15 the Labour Party suffered a historical defeat of 29 seats in the House. The party ended up with nine seats. After the defeat members of the Labour party called for the resignation as party chairman of Hans Spekman. On March 17 he announced that he would step down in the fall of 2017.

Personal life 
Spekman lives in the city of Utrecht.

References

External links 

  Hans Spekman at the website of the Labour Party

1966 births
21st-century Dutch politicians
Aldermen of Utrecht
Chairmen of the Labour Party (Netherlands)
Foundrymen
Labour Party (Netherlands) politicians
Living people
Members of the House of Representatives (Netherlands)
Metalworkers
Moldmakers
Municipal councillors of Utrecht (city)
People from Zuidplas
Smelters (occupation)